Bananal Island is a large river island formed from the bisection of the Araguaia River, in southwestern Tocantins, Brazil. The island is formed by a fork in a very flat section of the Araguaia River. The rivers within the island flow parallel to the Araguaia,  and the Jaburu do Bananal is the longest river within a river.

Environmental and cultural protection
Bananal Island is a nature and culture preserve. The northern third of the island, which is designated as a national park, is a popular destination for ecotourism. The southern two-thirds are indigenous territories.

Inhabitants
Although Brazilians of non-native descent lived on the island in the past, today only indigenous people populate the island.

At least four tribes live on Bananal Island: the Javaés, Karajá, Ava-Canoeiro, and Tuxá. There are sixteen aldeias or villages on the island: Barra do Rio, Barreira Branca, Boa Esperança, Boto Velho, Cachoeirinha, Fontoura, JK, Kanoanã, Kaxiwe, Macaúba, Santa Isabel, São João, Txoude, Txuiri, Wari-Wari, Watau.

There are no bridges to the island from the states of Tocantins to the east nor from Mato Grosso to the west. For the greater majority of the year, the only transport to the island is by boat. However, for a few weeks during the dry season (June - August) the river is low enough that the island can be reached by car. The villages have roads wide enough for cars and tractors even though the main forms of transport are by horse, bicycle, and foot.

Image gallery

Municipalities
From north to south, the island forms the western portions of the municipalities of Pium, Lagoa da Confusão, and Formoso do Araguaia, in southwestern Tocantins.

References

Ramsar sites in Brazil
Indigenous Territories (Brazil)
Landforms of Tocantins
River islands of Brazil